Dhanesh MC (born 22 September 1987) is an Indian footballer who played as a midfielder for ONGC F.C. in the I-League.

Career statistics

Club
Statistics accurate as of 11 May 2013

References

Indian footballers
1987 births
Living people
I-League players
ONGC FC players
Association football midfielders